The Ministry of Railways (abbreviated as MoR) is the ministry responsible for the railways and train services in Bangladesh. It was formed in 2011. Previous rail services were part of the ministry of communication ( dissolved)

History

In 2016 the ministry proposed a 7.8% hike in the ticket prices of Bangladesh Railways. The announcement faced criticism and demands for reduced corruption in the ministry.

Bangladesh Railway
Bangladesh Railway is a department under the Railway Ministry. It is responsible for the management of 2,791 kilometer rail network of Bangladesh.

References

Ministry of Railways (Bangladesh)
Ministry of Railways
Ministries established in 1971
1971 establishments in Bangladesh
Railways ministries